The 2018 High Point Panthers men's soccer team represented High Point University during the 2018 NCAA Division I men's soccer season. It was the 61st season of the university fielding a program.

Squad

Roster 

Updated October 28, 2018

Schedule

Source:

|-
!colspan=8 style=""| Regular season

|-
!colspan=8 style=""| Big South Tournament
|-

|-
!colspan=8 style=""| NCAA Tournament
|-

References

High Point Panthers men's soccer
High Point
High Point
High Point